Chiu Wing Yin Rebecca (born 24 November 1978 in Hong Kong), commonly known as Rebecca Chiu, is a female professional squash player from Hong Kong. Her highest world ranking is 13, achieved in October 2007.

See also
 Official Women's Squash World Ranking

External links 
 
 
 Profile at Doha-2006.com
 Profile at Hong Kong Olympic Committee

1978 births
Living people
Hong Kong female squash players
Alumni of the Chinese University of Hong Kong
Asian Games medalists in squash
Asian Games gold medalists for Hong Kong
Asian Games silver medalists for Hong Kong
Squash players at the 1998 Asian Games
Squash players at the 2002 Asian Games
Squash players at the 2006 Asian Games
Squash players at the 2010 Asian Games
Medalists at the 1998 Asian Games
Medalists at the 2002 Asian Games
Medalists at the 2006 Asian Games
Medalists at the 2010 Asian Games